Lochcraig Head is a hill in the Moffat Hills range, part of the Southern Uplands of Scotland. The second highest in the range, its southern slopes drop dramatically into Loch Skeen, the highest loch in the Southern Uplands, from which the Grey Mare's Tail waterfall originates. A common ascent is as a round from the car park to the south, taking in White Coomb.

Subsidiary SMC Summits

References

Mountains and hills of the Southern Uplands
Mountains and hills of the Scottish Borders
Donald mountains